Sir Shane Dunne Paltridge KBE (11 January 1910 – 21 January 1966) was an Australian politician. He was a member of the Liberal Party and served in the Menzies Government as Minister for Shipping and Transport (1955–1960), Civil Aviation (1956–1964), and Defence (1964–1966). He was a Senator for Western Australia from 1951 until his death in 1966. Prior to entering politics he worked as a bank clerk, hotel manager and soldier.

Early life
Paltridge was born on 11 January 1910 in Leederville, Western Australia. He was the son of Florence Marjory (née Thomas) and Archer Dunn Paltridge. His father worked as a banker and the family lived for periods in Western Australia, Queensland, and New South Wales. He attended primary school in Moora, Western Australia, Ipswich, Queensland, and Enmore, New South Wales, before completing his education to the age of 16 with an Intermediate Certificate from Fort Street Boys' High School in Sydney.

In 1927 Paltridge began working for the National Bank of Australasia (NBA) in Sydney. His parents separated the following year and he returned to Perth with his mother and sister, living at the Broken Hill Hotel in Victoria Park that was managed by his uncle by marriage. Paltridge continued to work for the NBA until 1936, when he took over as manager and licensee of the hotel, a "large and busy working man's pub". His aunt had inherited the lease in 1931 following her husband's death.

Paltridge enlisteded the Royal Australian Air Force (RAAF) in February 1940, but failed flying training. He was subsequently assigned as a stores clerk, but was discharged in December 1941 and joined the Australian Imperial Force (AIF) in February 1942. He saw overseas service as a gunner in the 2/7th Field Regiment, sailing to Morotai in April 1945 and serving in the Battle of Tarakan the following month. Paltridge returned to Australia in September 1945 following his mother's death. He subsequently resumed his management of the hotel.

Politics
Paltridge became a member of the Liberal and Country League of Western Australia (the Western Australian Branch of the Liberal Party of Australia) in 1946.  In 1951 he was elected to the Australian Senate.  He became Minister for Shipping and Transport (1955–60) and Minister for Civil Aviation (1956–64) under Prime Minister Robert Menzies.  In April 1964, he became Minister for Defence, during the early period of Australia's participation in the Vietnam War. Although he recommended against the immediate introduction of conscription in 1964, Cabinet decided to introduce it anyway.

Illness and death
Paltridge became gravely ill with cancer in late 1965.  He was made a Knight Commander of the Order of the British Empire on 1 January 1966 and died at Sir Charles Gairdner Hospital on 21 January 1966, having resigned as Minister for Defence two days earlier.

Personal life
Paltridge married Molly McEncroe on 21 January 1947, with whom he had two daughters. Mary, one of his daughters, was the first wife of the Labor politician Kim Beazley.

Notes

 

1910 births
1966 deaths
Deaths from cancer in Western Australia
Liberal Party of Australia members of the Parliament of Australia
Members of the Australian Senate for Western Australia
Members of the Australian Senate
Members of the Cabinet of Australia
Australian Knights Commander of the Order of the British Empire
Australian politicians awarded knighthoods
Defence ministers of Australia
20th-century Australian politicians
Royal Australian Air Force personnel of World War II
Royal Australian Air Force airmen
Australian Army personnel of World War II
Australian Army soldiers